The 1989 European Parliament election in Spain was held on Thursday, 15 June 1989, as part of the EU-wide election to elect the 3rd European Parliament. All 60 seats allocated to Spain as per the 1985 Treaty of Accession were up for election.

The Spanish Socialist Workers' Party (PSOE) emerged as the largest party, followed by the newly amalgamated People's Party (PP) and Adolfo Suárez's Democratic and Social Centre—both of which scoring far below expectations—, as well as left-wing United Left (IU), which improved slightly on its 1987 performance. Ruiz-Mateos Group was the election surprise by winning two seats, with former Rumasa CEO and party leader José María Ruiz Mateos being elected as MEP—which granted him immunity from criminal prosecution, as he had been a fugitive from Spanish justice at the time of his election—. Registered turnout was a record low at the time for a nationwide election held in Spain, with abstention peaking at 45.3%.

The election was largely influenced by a recent string of PP–CDS agreements to vote no confidence motions on PSOE local governments, which included the Madrid city council and regional governments. This was said to have influenced the election's outcome, which had resulted in a sizeable PSOE win and a collapse in support for both the PP and CDS. His party's showing in this election was said to be one of the reasons that led Prime Minister Felipe González to call a snap general election for 29 October 1989.

Electoral system
The 60 members of the European Parliament allocated to Spain as per the 1985 Treaty of Accession were elected using the D'Hondt method and a closed list proportional representation, with no electoral threshold being applied in order to be entitled to enter seat distribution. However, the use of the D'Hondt method might result in an effective threshold depending on the district magnitude. Seats were allocated to a single multi-member constituency comprising the entire national territory. Voting was on the basis of universal suffrage, which comprised all nationals over 18 years of age and in full enjoyment of their political rights.

The electoral law provided that parties, federations, coalitions and groupings of electors were allowed to present lists of candidates. However, they were required to secure the signature of at least 15,000 registered electors. Electors were barred from signing for more than one list of candidates. Parties, federations and coalitions were allowed to replace this requirement with the signature of at least 50 elected officials—deputies, senators, MEPs or members from the legislative assemblies of autonomous communities or from local city councils—. Concurrently, parties and federations intending to enter in coalition to take part jointly at an election were required to inform the relevant Electoral Commission within ten days from the election call.

Parties and coalitions
Below is a list of the main parties and coalitions which contested the election:

Opinion polls
The table below lists voting intention estimates in reverse chronological order, showing the most recent first and using the dates when the survey fieldwork was done, as opposed to the date of publication. Where the fieldwork dates are unknown, the date of publication is given instead. The highest percentage figure in each polling survey is displayed with its background shaded in the leading party's colour. If a tie ensues, this is applied to the figures with the highest percentages. The "Lead" column on the right shows the percentage-point difference between the parties with the highest percentages in a given poll. When available, seat projections are also displayed below the voting estimates in a smaller font.

Results

Overall

Distribution by European group

Notes

References
Opinion poll sources

Other

External links
European elections Spain in Europe Politique.

Spain
1989
European Parliament